The Perpetual Diet of Regensburg or the Eternal Diet of Regensburg, also commonly called in English the Perpetual Diet of Ratisbon, from the city’s Latin name, was a session of the Imperial Diet (Reichstag) of the Holy Roman Empire that sat continuously from 1663 to 1806 in Regensburg in present-day Bavaria, Germany.

Previously, the Diet had been convened in different cities but, beginning in 1594, it met only in the town hall in Regensburg. On 20 January 1663, the Diet convened to deal with threats from the Ottoman Empire (the Turkish Question). Since the Peace of Westphalia in 1648, the Holy Roman Emperor had been formally bound to accept all decisions made by the Diet. Hence, out of fear that the Emperor would disregard the Diet's role by not calling sessions, it never dissolved and became a perpetual diet. From 1663 until the 1684 Truce of Ratisbon (a former name of Regensburg in English), the diet gradually developed into a permanent body.

In addition to envoys who represented the Imperial Estates in the Diet, Regensburg had around 70 representatives (Komitialgesandtern or Comitia) from foreign states. The Emperor was represented by a Principal Commissioner (Prinzipalkommissar), a position that accrued to the Thurn und Taxis family from 1748.

In its early years, the Perpetual Diet was a tool for consolidation of Habsburg power in the empire. However, by the middle of the 18th century, it was largely "dysfunctional" and a "mere congress of diplomats" that produced "no important legislation in political and constitutional matters".  The weak institution has been called "a bladeless knife without a handle", and, during the Diet's existence, the Empire increasingly became nothing more than a collection of largely independent states.

The last action of the Diet, on 25 March 1803, was the passage of the German Mediatisation, which reorganized and secularized the Empire.  Following the approval of that final constitutional document, the Diet never met again and its existence ended with the dissolution of the Empire in 1806.

List of imperial principal commissioners

See also

List of Reichstag participants (1792)

Notes

References

External links

Regensburg
Regensburg
17th century in the Holy Roman Empire
18th century in the Holy Roman Empire
1663 establishments in the Holy Roman Empire
1806 disestablishments in the Holy Roman Empire